Charles Kent may refer to:

People with the name
 Charles Kent (actor) (1852–1923), silent film actor and director
 Charles Kent (English writer) (1823–1902), English poet, biographer, and journalist
 Charles Kent (Norwegian writer) (1880–1938), Norwegian writer and literary critic
 Charles Kent (rugby union) (1953–2005), English rugby player 
 Charles Foster Kent (1867–1925), scholar
Sir Charles Kent, 1st Baronet, of the Kent baronets

Fictitious entities
Charles Kent, a character in the play Alibi

See also
Charlie Kent, a character in the 2015 film Infini